Cabo is a Mexican telenovela produced by José Alberto Castro for TelevisaUnivision. It is based on the 1985 Mexican telenovela Tú o nadie created by María Zarattini. It aired on Las Estrellas from 24 October 2022 to 17 February 2023. The series stars Bárbara de Regil and Matías Novoa.

Plot 
Hours after Sofía (Bárbara de Regil) and Alejandro's wedding, he leaves to attend to a business matter and dies in a plane crash. Devastated, Sofía travels to Cabo to meet her in-laws. When Sofía arrives, she is reunited with Alejandro, who is alive, and discovers that he is not the man she fell in love with. Alejandro reveals to her that his name is actually Eduardo (Diego Amozurrutia) and that he changed it so that she would be legally married to his brother, who was the one who died in the accident, and so that together they can inherit his fortune.

Sofía refuses to go along with Eduardo's plans, who now threatens to put her father in jail because he has incriminated him of being responsible for the accident in which Alejandro died. Everything takes an unexpected turn when the real Alejandro (Matías Novoa) returns home, unharmed from the accident and is surprised to have a wife he remembers nothing about. Sofía will be forced to continue with the farce and eventually falls in love with the real Alejandro.

Cast 

 Bárbara de Regil as Sofía Chávez
 Matías Novoa as Alejandro Noriega
 Eva Cedeño as Isabela Escalante
 Diego Amozurrutia as Eduardo Torres
 Rebecca Jones as Lucía de Noriega 
 Rafael Inclán as Alfonso "Poncho" Chávez
 Mar Contreras as Vanesa Noriega
 Roberto Ballesteros as Fausto Cabrera
 Fabiola Campomanes as Malena Sánchez
 María Chacón as Rebeca Chávez
 Arlette Pacheco as Guadalupe Gutiérrez
 Raúl Coronado as Alan Ortega
 Carlos Athié as Ernesto Castillo
 Bárbara Torres as Carmen Pérez
 Gonzalo Vega Jr. as Luis Sánchez
 Markin López as Álvaro Ruíz
 Sofia Rivera Torres as Karen Escalante
 Lorena Sevilla as Blanquita Cabrera
 Felicia Mercado as Jimena Manrique
 Sergio Klainer as Hugo Reyes
 Fernando Robles as Ulises
 Christian de la Campa as Maximiliano "Max"
 Rafael Novoa as Miguel Cantú
 Azela Robinson as Lucía de Noriega

Production 
In May 2022, it was reported that it was reported that José Alberto Castro would be producing a new version of the 1985 telenovela Tú o nadie. On 6 July 2022, Bárbara de Regil was announced in the lead role. On 14 July 2022, an extensive cast list was published by People en Español. Filming began on 18 July 2022. The first teaser of the series was shown on 25 September 2022.

Ratings 
 
}}

Episodes

Notes

References

External links 
 

2022 telenovelas
2022 Mexican television series debuts
2023 Mexican television series endings
2020s Mexican television series
Televisa telenovelas
Mexican telenovelas
Spanish-language telenovelas